Zimbabwe competed at the 2011 World Championships in Athletics from 27 August to 4 September in Daegu, South Korea.

Team selection

A team of 4 athletes was
announced to represent the country
in the event.

Medalists
The following competitor from Zimbabwe won a medal at the Championships

Results

Men

Women

References

External links
Official local organising committee website
Official IAAF competition website

Nations at the 2011 World Championships in Athletics
World Championships in Athletics
Zimbabwe at the World Championships in Athletics